Iron Lung is a 2022 first-person immersion horror game developed by David Szymanski. The player controls an unnamed convict who explores an ocean of blood on an alien moon in a rusty submarine named the Iron Lung. It was released in March 2022 for Microsoft Windows. A Nintendo Switch port was released in December 2022.

Gameplay
The player controls the submarine's heading and forward velocity with a minimalist interface and must use their map and the submarine's camera to navigate.

Plot

Premise
A text entry before the game discusses the backstory, in which humanity has spread to outer space and colonized many other planets. A mysterious event known as the "Quiet Rapture" causes all habitable planets and stars in the universe to vanish, leaving only those aboard space stations or starships. With humanity's existence threatened and the survivors in desperate need of resources, an ocean somehow made up of blood is discovered to have formed on a desolate moon known as AT-5 two weeks before the start of the game. Three other such blood oceans had been discovered before, but this one contains readings deep within it that could signify natural resources.

The player character is a convict sent to descend into blood ocean in the titular submarine, the Iron Lung, to investigate these readings. They are promised freedom if they are able to capture pictures of unique resources. The Iron Lung itself is made out of old rusty space station parts and is poorly equipped to handle the deep ocean pressure, and the convict is untrained in its use. A note in the cabin reveals that the convict is skeptical and nihilistic regarding the future, stating that even if the researchers do grant them freedom after the mission, existence is bleak with the given state of the universe and they would prefer death in the blood ocean.

Story
The game starts with the convict in the submarine being lowered into the blood ocean. Due to the pressure, the main hatch is welded shut and the forward viewport encased with metal. An unknown man over the radio communicates a few instructions to the convict before cutting out and saying they're losing the signal, revealing that the convict will be on their own from then on.

The convict then begins using a map and coordinates to find nodes of interest within the ocean, capturing them on the submarine's grainy camera (also used as the main source of navigation). Several captures of nodes of interest reveal strange objects such as plant growth, rock formations, large unknown skeletons, and even what seem to be artificial structures on the ocean floor. At set points in the game, the sub's oxygen levels will decrease, pressure damage will occur, and a fire will start in the cabin, which the convict must put out with a fire extinguisher. One node on the left half of the map is a strange shimmering orb of light which will shake the submarine the closer the sub is to it. At another point in the game, attempting to photograph a specific node will instead reveal the eye of a massive sea creature, which will then smack the sub and cause blood to start leaking in. Upon reaching the final node, the convict will attempt to photograph it and when turning around to take the picture, the sea creature will breach the submarine before cutting to the title.

A post-game text entry reveals that there is no current method of retrieving the remains or the captured images from the sub, which has been torn to pieces in the blood ocean. Despite this, the text goes on to remain optimistic, stating that humanity will find a solution to the Quiet Rapture somewhere in the universe.

Reception
Iron Lung received positive reviews, with praise given to the game's oppressive atmosphere and soundscape.

Updates
On June 19th 2022 Iron Lung had an update that added more lore, achievements, new game map destinations, and Steam Points Shop items.

References

2022 video games
2020s horror video games
First-person video games
Indie video games
Post-apocalyptic video games
Science fiction horror video games
Single-player video games
Submarine simulation video games
Video games set in the future
Video games set on fictional moons
Windows games
Windows-only games
Video games developed by David Szymanski